Goloboffia is a genus of spiders in the family Migidae. It was first described in 2001 by Griswold and Ledford to accommodate the single species  Goloboffia vellardi, found in Chile. In 2019, more species were described. , five species were accepted:

Goloboffia biberi Ferretti, Ríos-Tamayo & Goloboff, 2019 – Chile
Goloboffia griswoldi Ferretti, Ríos-Tamayo & Goloboff, 2019 – Chile
Goloboffia megadeth Ferretti, Ríos-Tamayo & Goloboff, 2019 – Chile
Goloboffia pachelbeli Ferretti, Ríos-Tamayo & Goloboff, 2019 – Chile
Goloboffia vellardi (Zapfe, 1961) (type species) – Chile

References

Migidae
Mygalomorphae genera
Endemic fauna of Chile